This is a list of the queens consort of the Kingdom of Asturias.

During the reign of Ordoño I (850–866), the Kingdom of Asturias progressively came to be known as the Kingdom of León. The kingdom was split in 910 and Fruela received the part which kept the name of Asturias.

For the later consorts, see the list of Leonese Queen Consorts.

See also 
List of Asturian monarchs
Princess of Asturias
List of Hispanic consorts
List of Castilian Queen Consorts
List of Galician monarchs
List of Navarrese royal consorts
Royal Consorts of Spain
Princess consort of Asturias

Sources

Asturian queens consort
Asturian queens consorts, List of
Asturian